Danio flagrans  is a species of Danio found in the upper Mali Hka river drainage in northern  Myanmar.

References

Danio
Fish described in 2012
Cyprinid fish of Asia